Dark Beast (Henry Philip McCoy), also known as the Black Beast, is a fictional Supervillain; appearing in American comic books published by Marvel Comics. The character is depicted as an alternate reality evil version of the X-Men's Beast.

In the Age of Apocalypse reality, McCoy was a mad scientist who implemented cruel experiments under the tyrant Apocalypse. He was one of many characters to escape the Age of Apocalypse reality to the regular Marvel Universe, where he continued his unethical experiments.

Publication history
Dark Beast first appeared in X-Men: Alpha and was created by Scott Lobdell and Roger Cruz.

Fictional character biography

Age of Apocalypse
In the alternate dimension he came from, Hank McCoy was a mad scientist and geneticist working for Mister Sinister in his breeding pens, intent on breeding more powerful mutants according to Apocalypse's "survival of the fittest" ideology. Because of Charles Xavier's death, and without being taught ethical science while in the X-Men, McCoy became someone ruthless and evil. While Sinister was methodical and rational in his experiments, McCoy found sadistic delight in causing pain to his lab subjects. It was the cruelty of his experiments that caused him to be nicknamed "the Beast", both by prisoners and Sinister's Elite Mutant Force. McCoy also experimented on himself in order to further his mutation, and gained his ape-like bestial appearance. Any mutant that he deemed unworthy was turned into a component of a genetic stew that was used to create Apocalypse's army of Infinites.

Besides being one of the creators of the Infinites, the Dark Beast also experimented on Blink, Jamie Madrox (thus being one of the creators of The Madri), Impossible Man, merged all of the Power siblings into one hideous creature, created Tiger Shark, made Nemesis into Holocaust following his defeat at the hands of Magneto, and was also responsible for the creation of Holocaust's lead hunter Wolverine (not to be confused with the X-Men's Wolverine who was known only as Weapon X in that reality).

Into the Main Reality
With the end of the Age of Apocalypse, the Dark Beast was able to escape into Earth-616 through the M'Kraan Crystal. He was believed to have died due to Quicksilver's interference in his set trajectory. However, the only damage was that he landed twenty years in the past of Earth-616 without any memory whatsoever. He soon met a young Emma Frost, who helped him to regain some of his scattered memories. The Dark Beast then set base in Manhattan's subway tunnels, and was responsible for the creation of the Morlocks. The characteristics of the experimentation were later recognized by the 616 Mister Sinister as an unauthorized use of his own theories, leading him to order the elimination of the Morlocks. Fearing discovery, the Dark Beast continued his operations in secret. During this time he also trained Marshall Stone III how to control his powers, and set him up as the bounty hunter known as Random.

Infiltrating the X-Men
The Dark Beast later kidnapped the real Beast and kept him a prisoner behind a brick wall. He infiltrated the X-Men in his place by altering his appearance to match the real McCoy's fur color, although he occasionally found himself at risk of discovery due to Hank possessing a broader range of knowledge than himself, requiring him to bluff his way through some of the questions he was asked. He helped keep up the ruse by slaying many of Hank's childhood friends and teachers, although he found himself unable to kill Hank's parents. Angered at this emotional weakness, he decapitated a pedestrian as he left town. The Dark Beast was able to keep up his ruse until the Onslaught Saga, during which the Dark Beast joined Onslaught. Onslaught had, in fact, known from the beginning of Dark Beast's ruse and mentally shielded him from other telepaths at the mansion, intending to question him about the reality of his origin. However, upon learning what happened in Dark Beast's reality when mutants ruled, Onslaught decided to destroy both races rather than helping mutants take their place as the world's rulers, only just being defeated thanks to the sacrifice of the Avengers and Fantastic Four.

Gene Nation
He also had a few run-ins with Generation X and Gene Nation. There he was the leader of the newly revamped Gene Nation, although through the robotic body of Wynter, attempting to capture Generation X to experiment on them. The previous meeting between him and Emma Frost was also revealed. He also led an incarnation of the Brotherhood of Mutants.

Right before House of M, the Dark Beast was in Genosha where he joined Xavier's team after being offered parole. It was confirmed in The 198 Files one-shot that he stayed powered after M-Day.

Endangered Species
Dark Beast returns and finally confronts his counterpart in the Endangered Species storyline, where he ambushes him in Neverland, the extermination camp ran by Weapon X, to offer his services regarding finding a cure for M-Day. The two form an uneasy alliance to tackle the impending mutant extinction, but part ways due to their drastically different moral approaches to science. During a trip to the Guthrie household aimed at requesting samples of DNA from the mother and father of several mutant, and non-mutant, children - the Dark Beast (without warning Henry) poisons one of the un-mutated Guthrie boys, Lewis, in a quick scientific experiment. He then carries the dying boy's body back to the house, suggesting that they should try one of the girls next. Shocked and enraged with his actions, Hank attacks the Dark Beast who, disgusted with Henry's inability to do all that is necessary to save their mutant species, beats him almost unconscious. The fight is interrupted by Mrs. Guthrie, who fires a round from a double-barrelled shotgun into Dark Beast's left shoulder. After scolding Mrs. Guthrie for thinking a round of birdshot would put him down, the Dark Beast is knocked unconscious by Henry.

Dark X-Men
During the Dark Reign story-line, Dark Beast later appears as a member of the Dark X-Men (a team of X-Men put together by Norman Osborn). He serves as the team's scientist. He constructs a device known as the "Omega Machine" to experiment on mutants in Alcatraz for H.A.M.M.E.R. and starts testing on Beast, causing him great pain and torment as it begins slowly eating him away. Osborn is not impressed with the test results of the Omega Machine and wants Dark Beast to make sure the machine works in removing powers from mutants, not killing them. Dark Beast continues to experiment with his Omega Machine, using Beast as his key test subject. Each use of the device causes Beast to look more decrepit and weak. Deciding to use a new subject to test the device on, Dark Beast goes to collect the newly captured Mindee of the Stepford Cuckoos. When he reaches the holding cell however, he discovers that Mindee's capture was done to allow X-Force to follow. Dark Beast is then attacked and stabbed multiple times by both Wolverine and Warpath.

Dark Beast recovered quickly from his injuries suffered by the hands of Wolverine and Warpath as he was sent by Norman Osborn as well as Mimic, Weapon Omega and Mystique under Jean Grey's form, to investigate the cause of several inhabitants of a small town to dream-walk and continuously repeat "I'm an X-Man". As they investigate, both Mimic and Omega are overwhelmed by some kind of energies and go on a rampage, leaving Mystique and Dark Beast alone with a patient that they were examining. Shortly thereafter the energies takes a humanoid form, and Nate Grey, best known as X-Man, once more takes physical form, much to Dark Beast's shock and horror.

Back to origins
Dark Beast has since returned to the Morlock's Tunnels after the fall of Norman Osborn. He was able to capture the Lizard and began developing a means of enhancing the Lizard's control of the reptilian parts of the human brain in order to turn human beings into humanoid lizards. Dark Beast had been abducting victims of bullying or abuse from the streets, until the X-Men and Spider-Man found his base. Dark Beast locks Spider-Man out of the room and triggers the mutation in Gambit, Storm, Emma Frost and Wolverine, although Emma comes through the 'attack' unharmed as she is in her diamond form, giving her and Spider-Man time to escape Dark Beast's minions and release the Lizard to knock him out. Later the X-Men and Spider-Man reverse the process and take Dark Beast into custody.

Dark Angel Saga
While being transported, Dark Beast is approached by the Uncanny X-Force team, who wanted McCoy's help to find a cure for Archangel. As Warren succumbs to the darkness within him, Dark Beast confronted the team with the revelation that the only place left to turn for a cure is the Age of Apocalypse reality.

They arrived ten years after the X-Men had defeated Mister Sinister, yet it appears that the X-Men still face enormous challenges in this harsh setting. As they follow Dark Beast, unknowingly followed by Wild Child and Sabretooth, to one of his labs, Dark Beast approaches one Gatekeeper, who reveals that no one has ever entered the lab after Dark Beast's disappearance. As they walk in they find a picture with Sinister, Dark Beast, Havok and Cyclops on it, with Dark Beast mistakenly revealing that Prelate Scott Summers is also dead. Dark Beast soon finds the life seed. Nightcrawler then teleports in and swipes the seed away, before he could give it to the X-Force, figuring that Dark Beast was up to some evil plot. After a brief quarrel which ended with the life seed destroyed by Sunfire and Psylocke recognizing Sabretooth from her time on the Exiles, Dark Beast sneaks over to the portal back to the main Marvel Universe, Earth-616, and walks in, leaving X-Force stranded in the Age of Apocalypse world. He then released the now fully evil Dark Angel from his prison and helped him form an army to destroy Earth.

X-Termination
Following the events of the Dark Angel Saga, Dark Beast has assumed command over the Clan Akkaba of Earth 616 and relocated off world alongside Ozymandias, Famine, War, a pregnant Pestilance, and a badly injured Earth 295 Blob. It also appears he retrieved Sugar Man from Steve Rogers' custody, and together they have rebuilt the dimensional portal technology and returned to the Age of Apocalypse, where the two are using the energies of the life seed to aid Weapon Omega to resurrect a number of fallen mutants in order to provide Weapon Omega an army of powerful mutants.

At an undisclosed time, Dark Beast leaves the Age of Apocalypse and returns to Earth-616 Universe. He is soon approached by the AoA version of Nightcrawler, who wants to return to their home dimension. Using the Celestial Dreamer, Dark Beast once again opens a dimensional portal and returns to the Age of Apocalypse along with Nightcrawler. There, he discovers Weapon Omega's defeat at the hands of the human coalition and the capture of the Apocalypse seed. However, returning to the Age of Apocalypse with the X-Men and X-Treme X-Men in tow resulted in the release of evil beings known as the Exterminator which were trapped in the walls between realities by their creators, the Celestials, and destroy anyone they touch.

In order to defeat these cosmic beings, the X-Men and X-Treme X-men decided to imprisoned them within that reality forever, otherwise, the Exterminators would destroy the whole multiverse. AoA Nightcrawler teleports them to Earth-616 one at a time and Dark Beast goes with them. Dark Beast arrives on Earth-616 but is knocked out by Gambit. After the Age of Apocalypse reality is closed forever with AoA Nightcrawler's sacrifice, Dark Beast is taken away by the authorities.

Vindictive End
Dark Beast was soon able to escape from the authorities and was revealed to be the mastermind behind the events that lead the Uncanny X-Men and S.H.I.E.L.D. to war. He started hunting the X-Men affiliated with Cyclops by hacking into S.H.I.E.L.D. using classified research sources to upgrade his work and find the X-Men. He was the one to infect Cyclops, Emma Frost, Magik, Magneto and Colossus with nano-sentinels, which is the reason for their broken powers after the incident with the Phoenix Force.  Beast finally launches a coordinated attack using a hijacked S.H.I.E.L.D.'s Helicarrier to launch a nuclear strike, and new indestructible sentinels that have adapted to all the X-Men's powers. The only thing he didn't account for was the new X-Man David Bond, aka Hijack, who can control any electronic device. Dark Beast's body has been so weak after experimenting on himself, that he needed a life support suit, so after a short battle his suit was eventually punctured, and he set a bomb that caused his apparent death.

During the "Last Days" part of the Secret Wars story-line, it was mentioned months ago that Dark Beast was among the scientists that Magneto's right-hand person Briar tried to contact in order to make a special cocktail to augment Magneto's powers for the upcoming incursion between Earth-616 and Earth-1610. This occurred sometime before he began suffering from his own genetic experiments.

Secret Empire
During the "Secret Empire" storyline, Dark Beast turns up alive and no longer having health problems. He is shown to have set up a laboratory under an outhouse somewhere in the mutant nation of New Tian following Hydra's takeover. He used this lab to experiment on Inhumans. While searching for an Inhuman named Leer, Quake and the Secret Warriors found Dark Beast's hidden lair. Quake confronted Dark Beast on the whereabouts of Leer, but Dark Beast claimed that he didn't know who Leer was. He continued to profess his ignorance even when tortured by Quake and Karnak. Then a team of New Tian mutants entered the laboratory to remove the Inhumans for intruding into New Tian, and Dark Beast was taken into the mutants' custody.

Technologic Body
Dark Beast's apparent resurrection was later revealed to be Mister Sinister's doing, who saw fit to save Dark Beast's head and attached it to a brand-new body that appeared to be Dark Beast's old self, but with some technological improvements. He was eventually defeated and held prisoner at Harry's basement.

Faced with a lack of resources, Cyclops agrees to let Dark Beast work on an 'anti-vaccine' to neutralize Callahan's current mutant 'vaccine', with Warlock monitoring the process of creating the cure to ensure that it does only what Dark Beast says, Dark Beast defining it as a simple airborne virus that will feed the mutant vaccine's virus before it can smother the X-Gene, leaving them free to activate. However, after the anti-vaccine has been dispersed worldwide, it is revealed that Dark Beast, with some help from Mister Sinister, had in fact 'tricked' the X-Men as the serum indeed shuts the virus of the mutant vaccine's and is harmless to those who already had their X-Gene activated, but in the presence of a still inactive X-Gene, it works as a catalyst, becoming lethal for potential mutant children. Dark Beast reasoning that this will 'test' humanity's hatred of mutants by putting them in a position where they will risk their children dying to prevent them becoming mutants. As Dark Beast continues mocking them, Magik executes him with her teleportation discs to send part of Dark Beast into the ceiling, killing him.

During the "Sins of Sinister" storyline, it is revealed that Dark Beast's head was retrieved and secretly kept alive and preserved in a tube by Mister Sinister which he uses for advice. When Dark Beast asks for Mister Sinister to let him out, Mister Sinister informs him that he's not the "darkest beast" anymore.

Powers and abilities
The Dark Beast has the same superhuman abilities and intelligence as the main Marvel Universe's Beast before he underwent his secondary mutation. However, Dark Beast was not physically as powerful as his counterpart was in the normal Marvel continuity as he did not train on a regular basis, also being hampered by the fact that he is 20 years older than the main universe's Beast. As well as being physically weaker, while as intelligent as his counterpart, "normal" Beast seems to possess a larger spectrum of knowledge, as evidenced when Dark Beast was infiltrating the X-Men and became annoyed at the amount of knowledge the X-Men expected him to possess. This is due to Dark Beast specializing in genetics, while 616 Beast maintained study in multiple fields, with the result that Dark Beast has more specialized knowledge on that topic where "normal" Beast is more adaptable.

After gaining a cybernetic body, courtesy of Mr. Sinister, Dark Beast can counter-react to any attack made at him. He as demonstrated the ability to alter the shape of his body and generate new limbs, energy-deflecting shields and weapons.

The cannons in his arms, allows McCoy to project powerful energy beams and he can also discharge powerful electric shocks from his body.

Reception
 In 2018, CBR.com ranked Dark Beast 16th in their "Age Of Apocalypse: The 30 Strongest Characters In Marvel's Coolest Alternate World" list.

Other versions

Mutant X
An alternate Dark Beast is seen in the X-Men: Endangered Species story-line alongside Brute of the Mutant X reality.

Secret Wars (2015)
During the Secret Wars story-line, a version of Dark Beast resides in the Battleworld domain known as the Domain of Apocalypse. He is shown to have Doctor Nemesis as his assistant in his experiments, unaware that Doctor Nemesis has been tampering with a sample of the Legacy Virus. The X-Men defeated Dark Beast in order to get their hands on the Legacy Virus just as Apocalypse arrives and plans to use the Legacy Virus into seeing who would survive it.

In other media
In the X-Men Legends II: Rise of Apocalypse video game, Dark Beast appears as a brainwashed Beast who believes himself to be a follower of Mister Sinister and Apocalypse. He battles the player as a boss along with Mister Sinister. The cause of Beast's actions was the drugs created by  Mister Sinister. After being cured, Beast begins to feel guilty for his actions. Dark Beast has special dialogue with Storm.

Dark Beast is featured as an Age of Apocalypse alternate uniform for Beast in Marvel Future Fight.

References

External links
 Dark Beast at Marvel.com
 Dark Beast at Marvel Wiki
 Dark Beast at Comic Vine

Comics characters introduced in 1995
Alternative versions of comics characters
Fictional characters with superhuman senses
Fictional physicians
Fictional geneticists
Fictional murderers
Fictional mad scientists
Marvel Comics characters who can move at superhuman speeds
Marvel Comics characters with superhuman strength
Marvel Comics mutants
Marvel Comics male supervillains
Marvel Comics scientists
Characters created by Scott Lobdell
X-Men supporting characters